Lake Tugalo is a  reservoir with  of shoreline located in the northeastern Georgia in Habersham and Rabun counties, but also lies partially in Oconee County, South Carolina. It is the fifth lake in a six-lake series created by hydroelectric dams operated by Georgia Power that follows the original course of the Tallulah River. The series starts upstream on the Tallulah River with Lake Burton followed by Lake Seed, Lake Rabun, Lake Tallulah Falls and Lake Tugalo, ending with Lake Yonah. The western arm of Lake Tugalo is filled by the Tallulah River and the eastern arm is filled by the Chattooga River.

Lake Tugalo began filling in 1923 with the completion of the Tugalo Dam, a gravity concrete and masonry dam. The Tugalo Hydroelectric Plant has a generation capacity of 45 megawatts.

See also

List of lakes in South Carolina

Sources
Georgia Power lake levels

External links
TopoQuest Map for Lake Tugalo
History of Lake Tugalo

Reservoirs in Georgia (U.S. state)
Reservoirs in South Carolina
Protected areas of Rabun County, Georgia
Protected areas of Habersham County, Georgia
Protected areas of Oconee County, South Carolina
Dams in Georgia (U.S. state)
Georgia Power dams
Bodies of water of Rabun County, Georgia
Bodies of water of Habersham County, Georgia
Bodies of water of Oconee County, South Carolina
1923 establishments in Georgia (U.S. state)
1923 establishments in South Carolina